Conaire is an Irish language male given name. It gave rise to the original form of the anglicized surname Connery.

It is borne by two legendary High Kings of Ireland:
Conaire Mór (the great)
Conaire Cóem (the beautiful)

Other name holders include:
Pádraic Ó Conaire (1882–1928), Irish writer and journalist
Achadh Conaire, the Irish name of the village of Achonry, County Sligo

See also
List of Irish-language given names
Conair (disambiguation)

Surnames